.iq is the Internet country code top-level domain (ccTLD) for Iraq.

This domain was in limbo for several years, as the delegated manager was imprisoned in Texas on charges of alleged connections to Hamas (a State Department designated terrorist organization), for which he was later convicted in 2005. Some talk of redelegation and relaunching began taking place at the time of the 2003 invasion of Iraq, and in 2005 a redelegation to the National Communications and Media Commission of Iraq was approved by ICANN.

Registrations are within these categories:
 .iq – general
 gov.iq – governmental entities
 edu.iq – higher education institutions
 sch.iq – public and private schools
 com.iq – commercial entities recognised by the Ministry of Trade and/or other relevant authorities
 mil.iq – military institutions
 org.iq – non-profit organizations
 net.iq – network service providers recognised by the Ministry of Trade
 name.iq – individuals
Whois services can be found at whois.cmc.iq.

Restrictions 
The registration of .iq domains is limited to commercial commissions, Internet service providers, nonprofits, or schools and private institutions recognised by the Ministry of Higher Education and Scientific Research, natural individuals, citizens, or residents in Iraq.

References

External links 
 .iq subdomain registration page
 IANA .iq whois information
 2005 news article on relaunch
 Currently active .iq sites (Google search)

Internet in Iraq
Country code top-level domains
Telecommunications in Iraq
Mass media in Iraq

sv:Toppdomän#I